Pennsylvania Turnpike Extension may refer to:
Northeastern Extension of the Pennsylvania Turnpike
various other historic extensions of the Pennsylvania Turnpike main line
Pennsylvania Extension of the New Jersey Turnpike